Joey Chui Yung Wat (born c. 1971) is a chief executive officer of Yum China Holdings, Inc. (NYSE: YUMC).   She also served as CEO of KFC China, managing director of A.S. Watson Group UK, and spent seven years in management consulting.

As of May 2020, she is one of only 37 female CEOs on the Fortune 500.

Early life and education  
Wat was born in Fujian Province in China and moved to Hong Kong with her family at a young age. Wat received her bachelor's degree from Hong Kong University and an MBA from Northwestern University's Kellogg School of Management.

Career 
Wat started her career as a consultant at A.T. Kearney, and then from 2000 to 2003 as a management consultant at McKinsey & Company in Hong Kong.

She joined A.S. Watson Group UK in 2004, becoming head of strategy for over 10 countries in Europe and managing director of A.S. Watson Group UK. In September 2014, she moved back to China and joined Yum China, where she served as president of KFC China before being promoted to chief executive officer of KFC China in 2015. Wat then served as president and chief operating officer of Yum China and became a member of the firm's  board of directors in 2017. Since March 1, 2018, she has served as its chief executive officer.

Awards 
Wat was ranked as one of the “Top 50 Most Influential Business Leaders in China” and as one of the “Top 25 Most Powerful Women in Business in China” by Fortune Chinese Edition in 2018 and 2017 respectively.

See also
Wat (surname)

References 

Kellogg School of Management alumni
Chinese women chief executives
Living people
1970s births
Yum! Brands people
Businesspeople from Fujian
Alumni of the University of Hong Kong
McKinsey & Company people
Chinese food industry businesspeople
20th-century Chinese businesswomen
20th-century Chinese businesspeople
21st-century Chinese businesswomen
21st-century Chinese businesspeople